The Gallant Unit Citation (GUC), a United States Air Force and United States Space Force unit award, was approved in March 2004 and is awarded to any Air Force or Space Force unit which distinguishes itself by extraordinary heroism while engaged in armed combat with an enemy force on or after 11 September 2001.

Award Description
The GUC requires a lesser degree of gallantry, determination and esprit de corps than that required for the Presidential Unit Citation (PUC). The unit must have performed with marked distinction under difficult and hazardous conditions in accomplishing its mission so as to set it apart from and above other units participating in the same conflict. The degree of heroism required is the same as that which would warrant award of the Silver Star to an individual. The GUC will normally be earned by units that have participated in single or successive actions covering relatively brief time spans. Only on rare occasions will a unit larger than a group qualify for the GUC. Extended periods of combat duty or participation in a large number of operational missions, either air or ground, is not sufficient. Additional awards of the Gallant Unit Citation are denoted by oak leaf clusters.

Cited units
The only units to date that have received this award are the 385th Air Expeditionary Group,352d Special Operations Group, the 332d Air Expeditionary Group, the 16th Operations Group (redesignated as the 1st Special Operations Group in 2006), the 720th Special Tactics Group, and the 74th Fighter Squadron, as well as units subordinate to each during the cited time frame.

Subordinate units to the 16th Operations Group receiving the award
4th Special Operations Squadron
6th Special Operations Squadron
8th Special Operations Squadron
9th Special Operations Squadron
15th Special Operations Squadron
16th Special Operations Squadron
19th Special Operations Squadron
20th Special Operations Squadron
16th Operations Support Squadron
16th Operations Group, Operating Location D
919th Special Operations Group 
711th Special Operations Squadron
919th Operations Support Squadron
5th Special Operations Squadron
AFSOC Air Operations
Operating Location JM1 Air Force Element Medical
Air Force Element Medical DoD, Operating Location Special Operations Squadron

References

Awards and decorations of the United States Air Force
Awards and decorations of the United States Space Force
Awards established in 2004